The Rugby and Stamford Railway was an early railway in England built in 1850. The London and Birmingham Railway had already built a branch from Blisworth to serve Northampton and extend to Peterborough. The success of this, the Northampton and Peterborough Railway encouraged the directors to look for other ventures. They decided upon a branch from Rugby to Stamford which would link up with other new railways in the east of the country.

At approximately the same time the Midland Railway was building its Syston to Peterborough line which opened in 1848.  It was therefore necessary to share its line between Luffenham and Stamford.

Authorisation
The "Act to empower the London and Birmingham Railway Company to make a Branch Railway from Rugby to the Syston and Peterborough Railway near Stamford." (The Rugby and Stamford Railway Act, 1846). 9 Victoria, cap. lxvii. was passed in 1846, a month before the line became part of the London and North Western Railway.

Construction
Like the earlier branch it was built as a single line which could be doubled at a later date if needed.  From Rugby the line followed the valley of the Warwickshire Avon and then the Welland Valley. Although it eased construction with few earthworks it  involved a number of river crossings. During the construction the major contractor became bankrupt in 1848. Joseph Firbank, railway contractor, lost much of his savings as a result.

Opening and expansion
The section from Rugby to Market Harborough, opened in 1850. Originally single track, it was doubled at the end of 1878.

Market Harborough to Rockingham opened a month late, but the remainder to Luffenham was not completed until a year later. The line was not doubled throughout until 1878.

The increased traffic into Rugby proved a problem, particularly when the Northampton Loop Line opened in 1881.  The LNWR therefore applied to build a flyover at the south end of the station and a single track viaduct of some 30 arches which would bring the line in from Clifton Mill.  These were completed in 1885.

At Market Harborough the Midland Railway arrived in 1857 on its way to Bedford and London.  The Midland arranged to share the station but traffic increased to such a degree that a flyover was planned over the LNWR lines north of the station.  However instead the two companies build a new joint station which opened in 1884 although not fully completed until February 1886. Passenger traffic was not great, with only a few trains each way on weekdays and two on Sundays.

This opened for freight on 2 July 1879, and passengers on 1 November. Although the line from Seaton to Luffenham was now of little importance, it remained double and Morcott station was built as a double line station. The section was not singled until 1907.

Closure
Despite offering a more direct route between the Midlands and East Anglia, the line was closed on 6 June 1966 as part of the Beeching Axe in favour of the longer Birmingham to Peterborough Line which served larger population centres.

In January 2019, Campaign for Better Transport released a report identifying the line which was listed as Priority 2 for reopening. Priority 2 is for those lines which require further development or a change in circumstances (such as housing developments).

References

Rail transport in Leicestershire
Rail transport in Lincolnshire
Rail transport in Northamptonshire
Rail transport in Warwickshire
London and North Western Railway
Early British railway companies
Railway companies established in 1846
Railway lines opened in 1850
Railway lines closed in 1966
1846 establishments in England